Edward Matejkovic is a retired American football coach at athletic director.  He served as the head football coach at The College at Brockport, State University of New York in Brockport, New York from 1986 to 1994, where he completed a record of 41–68–2.

Matejkovic also served as Brockport's athletic director from 1990 to 1995, when he left to become the athletic director at his alma mater, West Chester University in West Chester, Pennsylvania.

Head coaching record

References

Year of birth missing (living people)
Living people
Brockport Golden Eagles athletic directors
Brockport Golden Eagles football coaches
West Chester Golden Rams athletic directors
West Chester University alumni
People from Coatesville, Pennsylvania